Raimo Jõerand (born 15 July 1972 in Tallinn) is an Estonian documental film director and scenarist.

2003-2005 he worked at production company OÜ Eetriüksus, being the chief producer of feature films. 2006-2013 he worked at Estonian Film Foundation, being a film specialist.

Filmography

 2006 	"Sinimäed" (documental film; director and scenarist)	
 2018 	"Hetk ajaloos"  (television series; director and scenarist)	
 2018 	"Rodeo" (documental film; director and scenarist)
 2019 	"Ajakapslid" (documental film; director and scenarist)
 2019 	"Peep Puksi lugu" (documental film; director and scenarist)
 2021 	"Sea aasta" (documental film; director and operator)

References

Living people
1972 births
Estonian film directors
Estonian screenwriters